"Gone Long Gone" is a song written and recorded by Canadian country artist Jason Benoit. The track was produced by David Thomson, Gabriel Gallucci, and Max River. It was the second single off his debut studio album Waves.

Background
Benoit was writing a post on Twitter when he realized he could turn the words he had written into the opening line of a song. He wrote the song by himself at home in Newfoundland. Benoit remarked that the process from writing the tweet to recording the full track took approximately eight months as both Sony Music Canada and his manager believed it would be a great follow-up to his previous single "Crazy Kinda Love".

Commercial performance
"Gone Long Gone" reached a peak of number seven on the Billboard Canada Country chart for the week of July 18, 2015, marking Benoit's first career top ten hit. It also peaked at number 78 on the Canadian Hot 100 for the week of August 1, 2015, and was Benoit's first career entry on that chart. The song has been certified Gold by Music Canada.

Charts

Certifications

References

2015 songs
2015 singles
Jason Benoit songs
Sony Music singles